Woodrow Wilson Hall (also known as Wilson Hall)  is an American building on the campus of James Madison University (JMU) located on the center of the university's quadrangle in Harrisonburg, Virginia.  Dedicated on 15 May 1931, the building's namesake is President Woodrow Wilson, who was born in nearby Staunton.

The cornerstone of Wilson Hall was laid on June 19, 1930.  The building was constructed out of a blue-gray colored limestone block known as "bluestone" mined from several local quarries.

Occupancy and use 
Wilson Hall initially served as the main administration building for the university and housed the president's office, the post office, classrooms (located on the second and third floors), and the first permanent auditorium on campus (built with a capacity to seat 1,400).  During the late 1930s, a recording and broadcasting studio was built in the basement.  In the late 1960s, Wilson Hall hosted a men's lounge.  For a number of years, the art department was housed within the building.  The last classroom, a geography classroom/laboratory was moved out of Wilson Hall in 1990-91.  Currently, Wilson Hall houses the student administrative offices.

Architecture 
The building was designed by architect Charles M. Robinson.  Constructed as the centerpiece of the JMU quadrangle, Wilson Hall is a three-story building featuring a portico supported with four Roman Doric columns, and a hipped roof topped with a cupola.  The inset windows of the building are enclosed by bluestone walls, and are placed in bays with a variable rhythm of three, one, and two.  Facing northwest, Wilson Hall is flanked by Maury Hall (built in 1909) and Keezell Hall (built in 1927)

In popular culture 
The building is so loved by alumni and fans alike, that it has even been enshrined in LEGO form with multiple, custom building sets available.

Gallery

References

James Madison University
Buildings and structures in Harrisonburg, Virginia
School buildings completed in 1931